The Church of St Mary & Corpus Christi is a grade II* listed Church of England church in Down Hatherley, Gloucestershire. It was rebuilt to a design by Thomas Fulljames in 1859–60.

References

External links 

Down Hatherley
Down Hatherley
Down Hatherley
Borough of Tewkesbury
Thomas Fulljames buildings